Sssshhh... is a 2003 Indian slasher film written and directed by Pavan S. Kaul. It features Karan Nath, Dino Morea and Tanisha in the lead roles. It was produced by Sunil Mehta and Prem Kishen. The music was directed by Anu Malik. The movie was inspired by the 1996 Hollywood thriller Scream.

Plot
Late one night, Malini Gujral and her boyfriend Sunny are brutally murdered by a killer in a clown mask on their college campus.

Six months later, in Shimla, Malini's younger sister Mahek runs into police inspector Kamat Uncle. He tells her there is no progress in searching for her sister's killer, as no evidence was left behind. Mahek gets a call from the killer, which frightens her. The next day at college, she hangs out with her friends Rocky, Gehna, Rajat, Rhea, and Nikhil when she meets Suraj Rai, the man who returned her purse at the mall the other day. He is new to the campus from Delhi. It is obvious that Rocky is jealous and in love with Mahek. Over the course of the day, Mahek is stalked by the killer, who murders one of her teachers, Mrs. Roy.

There is a bloody shoe print at the crime scene, and inspectors believe it is the work of a serial killer. Rocky jokes about how he escaped having to take the psychology exam, and Kamat Uncle becomes suspicious, but Rocky's feet are bigger than the prints at the scene, eliminating him as a suspect. Suraj becomes nervous when his shoe size matches the footprint. Kamat Uncle suggests that they wait for the post-mortem report.

Mahek starts to avoid Rocky and apologizes to Suraj for his behavior. Suraj shares his close relationship with his father, and Mahek has flashbacks to when her dad left her family. She is comforted by her mom at home, who then leaves for an art convention in Delhi. Later that night, Mahek finds a window unlocked and realizes she's in the house with the killer. She notices an orange watch on the killer's wrist during the pursuit. She manages to alert Kamat Uncle and is able to fight the killer, who escapes before the police arrive. She runs outside, and Suraj is there. She notices the same orange watch on his wrist. Kamat Uncle arrives, and Suraj is arrested.

Mahek attends a party with Rocky but leaves early. On the foggy drive home, she receives a call from the killer. She is terrified because Suraj is supposed to be in jail. The killer appears on the road, causing Gehna to lose control of the car and crash into a river. Gehna is unconscious, and the killer tries to drown Mahek. Suraj arrives and fights the killer. It turns out he had an alibi. The killer escapes and is shot by Kamat Uncle. He jumps into the river, but the police are unsuccessful in recovering the killer's body.

Mahek makes amends with Suraj but continues to have visions of the killer. She has a breakdown, and her friends decide that they need to go on holiday. They go to an island and get trapped with the killer, who has followed them. They realise there is no escaping death now and argue over who cannot be trusted amongst them. Mahek is turned against Rocky as suspicious circumstances continue to surround him. Rajat, Rhea, and Nikhil are all murdered. Kamat Uncle and Rathod arrive on the island with news of Mahek's mother's death. Kamat Uncle is killed, and Suraj shoots the killer. When they remove the mask, it is Inspector Rathod. Rocky implores Mahek to accept his love, but Suraj shoots him.

Suraj reveals his identity as the killer. It is also revealed that Rajat was not killed but is alive. The killer is a duo. Suraj and Rajat are brothers. Their mother was raped by Mahek and Malini's estranged father, destroying their family after she committed suicide from the shame. Following their mother's suicide, their dad shot himself. For revenge, Suraj and Rajat killed Mahek's father first, followed by Malini, then her mother, and need to claim Mahek's life to repay the debt owed for her father ruining their lives.

Rocky shoots Suraj and Rajat, saving Mahek from the same fate as her family. Suraj dies at the hands of Mahek, who stabs him after his gunshot wound proves nonfatal. Rocky and Mahek ride back to the mainland on a boat in each other's arms.

Cast
 Karan Nath as Suraj Rai
 Dino Morea as Rocky
 Tanisha Mukherjee as Mehek Gujral
 Gaurav Kapur as Rajat Rai
 Kushal Punjabi as Nikhil
 Suvarna Jha as Gehna
 Tina Choudhary as Riya
 Alyy Khan as Inspector Akash Rathore
 Shivaji Satam as Commissioner Kamath
 Simone Singh as Malini Gujral
 Sambhavna Seth in an item number
 Kashmera Shah in an item number

Music
"Dheere Dheere Hua" - Alka Yagnik, Adnan Sami
"Ishq Da Maara" - Sunidhi Chauhan, Sukhwinder Singh
"Kab Mera Haal-E-Dil" - Sonu Nigam
""Sapney" - Sonu Nigam, Alka Yagnik
"Mohabbat main Yeh Kya" - Shaan
"Tera Mera Dil" - Sonu Nigam, Alka Yagnik

References

External links
 

2000s Hindi-language films
2003 films
Films scored by Anu Malik
Indian slasher films
Films set in Shimla
Indian mystery thriller films